Polen Uslupehlivan (born 27 August 1990) is a Turkish volleyball player of Fenerbahçe Istanbul and member of the Turkish national team.

Career
She played for Nilüfer Belediyespor.
Uslupehlivan won the gold medal at the 2013 Club World Championship playing with Vakıfbank Istanbul. Now, she plays for Fenerbahçe.  She was part of the Turkish team that competed at the 2012 Summer Olympics.

Awards

National team
2011 European League - 
2011 European Championship - 
2012 FIVB World Grand Prix - 
2014 Women's European Volleyball League - 
2015 Montreux Volley Masters - 
2015 European Games -

Clubs
 2012-13 Turkish Cup -  Champion, with Vakıfbank Spor Kulübü
 2012–13 CEV Champions League -  Champion, with Vakıfbank Spor Kulübü
 2012-13 Turkish Women's Volleyball League -  Champion, with Vakıfbank Spor Kulübü
 2013 Club World Championship -  Champion, with Vakıfbank Istanbul
 2013-14 Turkish Women's Volleyball League -  Champion, with Vakıfbank Spor Kulübü
 2014 Turkish Super Cup -  Runner-Up, with Fenerbahçe Grundig
 2014-15 Turkish Cup -  Champion, with Fenerbahçe Grundig
 2014–15 Turkish Women's Volleyball League -  Champion, with Fenerbahçe Grundig
 2014-15 Turkish Super Cup -  Champion, with Fenerbahçe Grundig
 2016–17 Turkish Volleyball Cup  Champion, with Fenerbahçe Grunding
 2016–17 Turkish Women's Volleyball League  Champion, with Fenerbahçe Grunding

See also
Turkish women in sports

References

1990 births
Living people
Turkish women's volleyball players
VakıfBank S.K. volleyballers
Nilüfer Belediyespor volleyballers
Sportspeople from Adana
Olympic volleyball players of Turkey
Volleyball players at the 2012 Summer Olympics
Fenerbahçe volleyballers
European Games gold medalists for Turkey
European Games medalists in volleyball
Volleyball players at the 2015 European Games
Turkey women's international volleyball players
Mediterranean Games silver medalists for Turkey
Mediterranean Games medalists in volleyball
Competitors at the 2013 Mediterranean Games